Hoagland is an unincorporated community in Highland County, in the U.S. state of Ohio.

History
The community was named after the local Hoagland family. A variant name was Ludwick. A post office called Ludwick was established in 1890, and remained in operation until 1906.

Notable people
 Buck Ewing (1859–1906), Hall of fame catcher for the New York Giants (MLB).

References

Unincorporated communities in Highland County, Ohio
Unincorporated communities in Ohio